Délivrance is the fourth full-length studio album by A Hawk and a Hacksaw, released in 2009 on The Leaf Label.

Singles
"Foni Tu Argile", a traditional Greek Rembetika song, is the first single from the album. It was released as a 500 copy, limited edition, hand-numbered 10” single, cut at 78rpm. It was also released digitally.

The song was featured on NPRs All Things Considered as the 'Song of the Day' in August 2009.

Track listing
 "Foni Tu Argile" - 3:55 	
 "Kertész" - 4:46 	
 "The Man Who Sold His Beard" - 5:37 	
 "Hummingbirds" - 2:29 	
 "Raggle Taggle" - 4:52 	
 "I Am Not A Gambling Man" - 2:38 	
 "Turkiye" - 5:07 	
 "Zibiciu" - 2:18 	
 "Vasilisa Carries A Flaming Skull Through The Forest" - 3:59 	
 "Lassú" - 2:01

Personnel
Jeremy Barnes - Accordion, Drums, Vocals
Heather Trost - Violin, Viola, Stroh Violin, Vocals, Accordion
Chris Hladowski - Bouzouki, Baglama
Ariel Muñiz - Cello
Balázs Unger - Cimbalom ("Kertész")
Kálmán Balogh - Cimbalom ("Hummingbirds")
Béla Ágoston - Clarinet, Other [Bratch]
Péter Pataj - Double Bass [Upright Bass]
Sari Kovács - Flute
Péter Bede - Saxophone
Ferenc Kovács - Trumpet, Violin
Mark Weaver - Tuba, Tuba [Baritone]
Recorded by Jeremy Barnes
Mixed by Griffin Rodriguez
Tracks 2, 3, 4, 6, 8 and 10 written by Jeremy Barnes.
Track 9 written by Heather Trost.
"Foni Tu Argile", "Raggle Taggle", "Turkiye" and "Lassú" are arranged traditional songs, adapted by Jeremy Barnes and Heather Trost.
Recorded in Budapest, Devon and Albuquerque, from August to December 2008.

References

2009 albums
A Hawk and a Hacksaw albums
The Leaf Label albums